The Leaving Trains were an American indie rock band from Los Angeles, California. The Leaving Trains were founded in 1980 by Falling James Moreland, a frontperson who became known for her chaotic performances and penchant for (male-to-female) cross-dressing.  Falling James had previously been a member of punk rock bands the Mongrels and the Downers before assembling the group with guitarist Manfred Hofer, bassist Tom Hofer, keyboardist Sylvia Juncosa and drummer Hillary Laddin. They played locally for three years before releasing their first album, Well Down Blue Highway, in 1984.

Career
Following their Kill Tunes LP (1986) for SST Records, Mike Barnett and Eric Stringer replaced the Hofer brothers in the group's lineup. Next came Fuck (SST, 1987),Transportational D. Vices (SST, 1988), and the Loser Illusion EP. In 1989 Falling James was married to Courtney Love for a short while. In 1991 Moreland briefly disbanded The Leaving Trains to form The Power of Sky.

Along with Power of Sky's bassist, Whitey Sims, Moreland reassembled Leaving Trains with a new lineup including Bobby Belltower (who had briefly played in the previous incarnation of the band) and Lenny Montoya. This lineup produced the album The Lump in My Forehead (recorded 1992, released 1993), but later in 1992 Chaz Ramirez (also known as a producer of such bands as Social Distortion and Stryper) and Dennis Carlin took over on bass and drums, respectively. Ramirez died on December 2, 1992 (of injuries sustained when an attic floor collapsed underneath him—some of his recordings with the Trains were posthumously released in 1994 on the album The Big Jinx), and Moreland was subsequently kicked out of the group. She went on to form a new band under the same name with Melanie Vammen on keyboards, Jimmy Green on Bass, and Allen Clark on drums. This lineup yielded Smoke Follows Beauty in 1997.

The Leaving Trains' last studio album, Emotional Legs, features a variety of musicians: Melanie Vammen (now on guitar), Dennis Carlin, Maddog Karla, Miss Koko Puff, Andrew Buscher, Allen Clark, and Jimi Green. Emotional Legs was released on Steel Cage Records in 2001. The Leaving Trains, that same year, would also do their final live performance at The Knitting Factory in Hollywood as a backup band for Australian punk pioneer Rob Younger, performing songs Younger had done with Radio Birdman and The New Christs. In 2005, Steel Cage Records released a live Leaving Trains album called Amplified Pillows.

Moreland occasionally wrote for L.A. Weekly until 2020 and no longer performs music.

Members
Original lineup
James Moreland - vocals
Manfred Hofer - guitar
Tom Hofer - bass
Sylvia Juncosa - keyboards
Hillary Laddin - drums

Later members
Mike Barnett - guitar
Eric Stringer - bass
Bobby Belltower - guitar
Lenny Montoya - drums
Aaron "Mo-Ron" Donovan- on guitar
Chris Whitey Sims - vocals, bass and guitar
Chaz Ramirez - bass
Dennis Carlin - drums
Melanie Vammen - guitar
Jimmy Green - bass
Jack Rabid - drums
Allen Clark - drums
Sam Merrick - guitar
John Anglim - drums
Jason Kahn - drums
Miss Koko Puff - bass
Bruce Gunnell - drums
"Terry Bag Graham" - Drums

Discography

Studio albums
Well Down Blue Highway (Bemisbrain/Enigma Records, 1984)
Kill Tunes (SST Records, 1986)
Fuck (SST, 1987)
Transportational D. Vices (SST, 1988)
Sleeping Underwater Survivors (SST, 1991)
Loser Illusion Pt. 0 EP (SST, 1991)
The Lump in My Forehead (SST, 1993)
The Big Jinx (SST, 1994)
Drowned and Dragged EP (SST, 1995)
Smoke Follows Beauty (SST, 1997)

Compilation albums
Favorite Mood Swings compilation (SST, 1998)
Emotional Legs (Steel Cage, 2001)
Amplified Pillows (Steel Cage Records)

References

Indie rock musical groups from California
Musical groups from Los Angeles
Musical groups established in 1980
Musical groups disestablished in 2001
1980 establishments in California
2001 disestablishments in California
Enigma Records artists
SST Records artists
Steel Cage Records artists